Hosey is a surname. Notable people with the surname include:

Dwayne Hosey (born 1967), former Major League Baseball outfielder
Steve Hosey (born 1969), former right fielder in Major League Baseball
William J. Hosey (1854–1937), American politician and mayor of Fort Wayne, Indiana

See also
Hisey